Grace McDonald Green (June 15, 1918 – October 30, 1999) was an American actress who appeared in films in the early 1940s, mostly B movies.

Born in New York City, she and her brother Ray McDonald had their Broadway debut in 1937 in Babes in Arms as part of the dance team and singing I Wish I Were in Love Again. Other Broadway plays in which she performed included One for the Money (1939), Very Warm for May (1939), and The More the Merrier (1941).

McDonald's work in Babes in Arms led to a film contract with Universal Pictures. She made her screen debut in 1940's Dancing on a Dime, and appeared in Give Out, Sisters (1942), It Ain't Hay (1943), Destiny (1944), See My Lawyer (1945), and Strictly in the Groove in 1942.

McDonald also performed in vaudeville. During World War II, she participated in publicity campaigns related to gasoline rationing, donations of books for military personnel, saving cooking fat for military use, rag salvage, and other public-service activities. She also worked as a hostess at the Hollywood Canteen and entertained troops during tours of Army camps.

In late 1944 she married Lt. Ralph Green and soon moved to Minneapolis, leaving Hollywood behind, and eventually having three children. She died of pneumonia in Scottsdale, Arizona on October 30, 1999.

Filmography

References

External links
 

1918 births
1999 deaths
20th-century American actresses
American stage actresses
American film actresses
Deaths from pneumonia in Arizona
Vaudeville performers